Piyadigamage Premachandra Sumanatilaka (?–1967) was a Ceylonese politician.

Sumanatilaka was elected to parliament at the 2nd parliamentary election, held between 24 May 1952 and 30 May 1952, successfully contested the Nuwara Eliya electorate as the United National Party candidate. He polled 3,852 votes (64% of the total vote), over 3,000 votes ahead of his nearest rival.

He was unable to retain the seat at the 3rd parliamentary election, held between 5 April 1956 and 10 April 1956, losing to the Sri Lanka Freedom Party candidate, Andrew Dissanayake, by over 1,000 votes.

References 

1967 deaths
Date of birth missing
Members of the 2nd Parliament of Ceylon
Sinhalese politicians
United National Party politicians